Vintage Real Estate (VRE) is a private investment firm founded by Fred Sands and is headquartered in Los Angeles, California. The company typically buys underperforming shopping centers and renovates them.

Current projects
 SouthBay Pavilion in Carson, California A 1.1 million square feet regional shopping mall.
 Heritage Mall in Albany, Oregon.  A 406,500 square feet shopping mall.
 The Village at Nellie Gail Ranch in Laguna Hills, California
 Wenatchee Valley Mall in East Wenatchee, Washington
 Martin Village in Lacey, Washington
 Far North Shopping Center in Albuquerque, New Mexico
 Hamilton Crossings Shopping Center in Hamilton, Ohio
 Santa Clarita Plaza in Santa Clarita, California
 450 N. Canon in the Golden Triangle area of Beverly Hills, California
 The Brentwood Gateway Building in Brentwood, West Los Angeles, California
The Mall at Whitney Field, Leominster, Massachusetts

References

External links
 Official website
 SouthBay Pavilion website
 Wenatchee Valley Mall website

Companies based in Los Angeles
Real estate companies of the United States